Tirohanga (Te Reo for "distant view") is a suburb of Lower Hutt City situated at the bottom of the North Island of New Zealand. The suburb is located on the western side of the Hutt River and State Highway 2.

Demographics

Tirohanga had a population of 1,287 at the 2018 New Zealand census, an increase of 123 people (10.6%) since the 2013 census, and an increase of 90 people (7.5%) since the 2006 census. There were 414 households. There were 633 males and 654 females, giving a sex ratio of 0.97 males per female. The median age was 39.6 years (compared with 37.4 years nationally), with 252 people (19.6%) aged under 15 years, 240 (18.6%) aged 15 to 29, 642 (49.9%) aged 30 to 64, and 153 (11.9%) aged 65 or older.

Ethnicities were 73.9% European/Pākehā, 5.8% Māori, 2.6% Pacific peoples, 21.2% Asian, and 4.4% other ethnicities (totals add to more than 100% since people could identify with multiple ethnicities).

The proportion of people born overseas was 32.2%, compared with 27.1% nationally.

Although some people objected to giving their religion, 49.2% had no religion, 33.6% were Christian, 4.7% were Hindu, 1.6% were Buddhist and 3.3% had other religions.

Of those at least 15 years old, 360 (34.8%) people had a bachelor or higher degree, and 102 (9.9%) people had no formal qualifications. The median income was $46,400, compared with $31,800 nationally. The employment status of those at least 15 was that 597 (57.7%) people were employed full-time, 150 (14.5%) were part-time, and 36 (3.5%) were unemployed.

Education

It is a Waldorf Steiner education founded in 1979.

References

Suburbs of Lower Hutt
Populated places on Te Awa Kairangi / Hutt River